Van Hasselt is a Dutch-language toponymic surname, meaning "from Hasselt", a town either in Belgian Limburg, Dutch Limburg, Overijssel, the District of Kleve, or East Frisia . Notable people with this surname include the following:

 Johan Coenraad van Hasselt (1797–1823), Dutch physician, zoologist, botanist and mycologist
 André Henri Constant van Hasselt (1806–1874), Dutch-Belgian writer and poet 
  (1814–1902), Dutch entomologist and toxicologist
 Barthold Theodoor Willem van Hasselt (1896–1960), Dutch chief executive
 Dr. Sjoerd Johan van Hasselt (1992–present), Dutch biologist specialized in chronobiology and sleep research 

Dutch-language surnames
Surnames of Dutch origin